William Wirt Clayton (1812–1885) was the son of noted Georgia politician Augustin Smith Clayton. In Atlanta, Georgia, W. W. Clayton became a judge, director of the Western and Atlantic Railroad, tax collector for Fulton County, Georgia and an officer of the Georgia National Bank.

References

1812 births
1885 deaths
People from Athens, Georgia
Businesspeople from Atlanta
19th-century American businesspeople